I Will Survive is an Australian talent show-themed television series that premiered on Network Ten on 21 August 2012. The premise of the show is to search for a new, unknown talent to perform in the Broadway production of the musical Priscilla, Queen of the Desert. Due to the Broadway theatre production closing in June 2012, the prize has been amended to another performance on Broadway, along with a $250,000 cash prize. The title of the show is derived from the title of a song in the production, "I Will Survive", originally sung by Gloria Gaynor.

I Will Survive was hosted by actor and singer Hugh Sheridan, and featured judges Jason Donovan, who played Tick in the West End theatre production of the show, and Stephan Elliott, the director of the film The Adventures of Priscilla, Queen of the Desert.

Format
I Will Survive searches for a "triple threat" performer, proficient in the disciplines of acting, singing, and dancing, to portray a drag queen as based on the hit musical Priscilla, Queen of the Desert. The show starts with open auditions, with the most talented performers joining the famous Priscilla bus, retracing the steps of the movie, from Sydney to Alice Springs, performing at outback locations on the way.

Top 12 contestants

Challenges

Ratings

References

Network 10 original programming
2012 Australian television series debuts
2012 Australian television series endings
2010s Australian reality television series
Television series by Fremantle (company)
English-language television shows
Singing talent shows